Martin John Kemp  (born 5 March 1942) is a British art historian and exhibition curator who is one of the world's leading authorities on the life and works of Leonardo da Vinci. The author of many books on Leonardo, Kemp has also written about visualisation in art and science, particularly anatomy, natural sciences and optics. Instrumental in the controversial authentication of Salvator Mundi to Leonardo, Kemp has been vocal on attributions to Leonardo, including support of La Bella Principessa and opposition of the Isleworth Mona Lisa.

From 1995 to 2008 he was professor of art history at the University of Oxford and has continued since then as an emeritus professor. He previously held posts at University of St Andrews (1981–1995) and University of Glasgow (1966–1981). He holds honorary fellowships of both Trinity College, Oxford and Downing College, Cambridge and is also a fellow of the British Academy.

Early life
In his youth, Kemp attended Windsor Grammar School. From 1960 to 1963, he studied natural sciences and art history at Downing College, Cambridge and  the history of Western Art at the Courtauld Institute of Art, University of London from 1963 to 1965.

Career

For more than 25 years he was based in Scotland where from 1966 to 1981 he was a lecturer at University of Glasgow and Professor of Fine Arts from 1981 to 1990 and Professor of the History and Theory of Art from 1990 to 1995 at University of St Andrews. Kemp was Professor of Art History at the University of Oxford from 1995 to 2008, during which he helped create the Centre for Visual Studies, which opened in 1999. Notably, Edgar Wind had held this post from 1955 to 1967 and subsequently Francis Haskell from 1967 to 1995. Since 2008 he has been emeritus professor of the art history there. He has held various visiting professorship posts at institutions such as Princeton University, University of Cambridge, University of Chicago and Harvard University. Kemp received the prestigious British Academy Wolfson Research Professorship—An award offered by the Wolfson Foundation.—and from 1993 to 1998 and was elected a fellow of the British Academy in 1991. With art historian Marina Wallace, Kemp launched the "Universal Leonardo" website.

Books
Kemp has written many books about Leonardo da Vinci, his first of which, Leonardo da Vinci. The Marvellous Works of Nature and Man in 1981, won the Mitchell Prize in art history for best first book. He has published on imagery in the sciences of anatomy, natural history and optics, including The Science of Art: Optical Themes in Western Art from Brunelleschi to Seurat (Yale University Press). The art theorist and psychologist Rudolf Arnheim said that The Science of Art "may deserve to be called the definitive treatise on its topic" though its detail may make it difficult reading for non-specialists.

He has written a regular column called "Science in Culture" in the scientific journal Nature. Selections of these columns have been published as Visualisations (OUP, 2000) and Seen and Unseen (OUP, 2006): the latter exploring his concept of "structural intuitions". Reviewing Visualisations, the historian of ideas Scott L. Montgomery described Kemp as like a "master gardener" who "for nearly two decades, [...] has helped shape this new field in major ways, planting a wide array of topics, arranging the colors of their importance, surveying and reconstituting the efforts of others, all the while adding original species of insight and subject matter." In 2011 he published Christ to Coke: How Image becomes Icon (OUP, 2011).

Salvator Mundi
The Salvator Mundi is a painted wooden panel depicting Christ. It was exhibited in 2011 as an original work by Leonardo da Vinci, but the attribution has been controversial, with some scholars describing da Vinci as a contributor but not the main artist. Kemp's research supported its attribution to da Vinci. He said that as soon as he viewed the painting, he recognised the presence and "uncanny strangeness" of da Vinci's works.  The painting was sold in 2017, setting a new record for the most expensive painting ever sold at public auction. In a 2019 book, Kemp identifies symbolism in the painting that is familiar from da Vinci's other religious paintings. He is interviewed in the 2021 documentary about the work, The Lost Leonardo.

La Bella Principessa

In 2010 he published a monograph together with French engineer Pascal Cotte, recounting the story of how a team of experts – under his guidance – pieced together the evidence for the extraordinary discovery of a major artwork by Leonardo, now named La Bella Principessa.  The book, entitled La Bella Principessa (2010), narrates the steps Kemp and Cotte took in authenticating the painting. The 2012 Italian edition, La bella principessa di Leonardo da Vinci produces evidence about its origins.

Exhibitions
Guest curator for Circa 1492 at the National Gallery of Art in Washington in 1992.
Spectacular Bodies: the Art and Science of the Human Body from Leonardo to Now at the Hayward Gallery, London (2001) (curated with Marina Wallace) A review of the exhibition catalogue described it as "a fascinating overview of the efforts over the past five centuries to understand the body through the intersecting lenses of art and science".
 Leonardo da Vinci: Experience, Experiment, Design at the Victoria and Albert Museum, London (2006) 
Seduced: Art and Sex from Antiquity to Now at the Barbican Art Gallery, London (2007)
Hockney's Eye (co-curator) at the Fitzwilliam Museum and Downing College Heong Gallery, Cambridge (2022)

Selected bibliography
  reprinted with revisions in 1992.
 
 
 
 
 
 
 
 
 
 
 
 
 
 
 
 

As editor

Notes

References

Further reading

External links
 
 
 Martin Kemp's articles on The Guardian
 Mona Lisa and the Body of the Earth: A Lecture by Martin Kemp at The Laguna Art Museum (11.15.16) – Vimeo

British art historians
Alumni of Downing College, Cambridge
Place of birth missing (living people)
Alumni of the Courtauld Institute of Art
Fellows of Downing College, Cambridge
Fellows of Trinity College, Oxford
Living people
1942 births
Academics of the University of Cambridge
Statutory Professors of the University of Oxford
Academics of the University of Glasgow
Academics of the University of St Andrews
Leonardo da Vinci scholars